Porcellis is a surname. Notable people with the surname include:

Jan Porcellis ( 1580/54–1632), Dutch marine painter
Julius Porcellis ( 1610/19–1645), Dutch marine painter, son of Jan
Rafael Porcellis (born 1987), Brazilian football player

See also
Porcelli
Porcel